Ainge is a surname. Notable people with the surname include:

Austin Ainge (born 1981), American basketball player and coach
Danny Ainge (born 1959), American basketball player and executive
Erik Ainge (born 1986), American football player
Simon Ainge (born 1988), English footballer